"Another Lonely Song" is a song recorded by American country music artist Tammy Wynette, who co-wrote the song with Billy Sherrill and Norro Wilson.  It was released in December 1973 as the second single and title track from the album Another Lomely Song.  The song was Wynette's fourteenth number-one solo hit on the country chart.  The single stayed at number one for a two weeks and spent a total of twelve weeks on the chart.

Chart performance

Cover versions
Andy Williams released a version of the song in 1974 that reached #29 on the adult contemporary chart.

References

1973 singles
1974 singles
Songs written by Billy Sherrill
Songs written by Norro Wilson
Tammy Wynette songs
Andy Williams songs
Song recordings produced by Billy Sherrill
Epic Records singles
Songs written by Tammy Wynette
1973 songs